Uddhav Balasaheb Thackeray (Marathi pronunciation: [ud̪ʱːəʋ ʈʰaːkɾeː], born 27 July 1960) is an Indian politician who served as the 19th Chief Minister of Maharashtra from 2019 to 2022. He was the president of Shiv Sena prior to its split in 2022, and leader of Shiv Sena (Uddhav Balasaheb Thackeray).

Early life
Uddhav Thackeray was born on 27 July 1960 as the youngest of politician Bal Thackeray and his wife Meena Thackeray's three sons. He did his schooling from Balmohan Vidyamandir and graduated from Sir J.J. Institute of Applied Art with photography as his main subject.

Political career 
In 2002, Thackeray started his political career as campaign incharge of Shiv Sena in the Brihan Mumbai Municipal Corporation elections where the party performed well. In 2003, he was appointed as working president of Shiv Sena. Uddhav took over as chief editor of party mouthpiece Saamana (a daily Marathi-language newspaper published by Shiv Sena) in 2006 and resigned in 2019 before becoming chief minister of Maharashtra. 

A split in Shiv Sena happened when his cousin Raj Thackeray left the party in 2006 to form his own party named Maharashtra Navnirman Sena. After the death of his father Bal Thackeray in 2012, he led the party and was elected as Shiv Sena president in 2013, and under his leadership Shiv Sena joined the NDA government in Maharashtra in 2014.

In 2019, Shiv Sena broke away with NDA and joined UPA. It formed a sub alliance called Maha Vikas Aghadi to form the government in Maharashtra with Uddhav Thackeray leading the ministry.

In 2022, during a party meeting, Uddhav Thackeray explained his move to pull out of NDA to join UPA. "We supported the BJP wholeheartedly to enable them to fulfill their national ambitions. The understanding was they will go national while we will lead in Maharashtra. But we were betrayed and attempts were made to destroy us in our home. So we had to hit back". Thackeray accused BJP of dumping its allies according to its political convenience. He said, "BJP doesn't mean Hindutva. I stand by my comment that Shiv Sena had wasted 25 years in alliance with BJP."

Chief Minister of Maharashtra
Though Thackeray never took any constitutional post in his political career initially, however after a brief political crisis, on 28 November 2019 he took the oath as 19th Chief minister of Maharashtra after being elected as the president of the newly formed post-poll coalition Maha Vikas Aghadi.

In a 2021 Prashnam Survey, Thackeray was ranked the most popular Chief Minister in India out of 13 states, with nearly half of all voters surveyed said that they will vote for him again.

Thackeray has committed Maharashtra to leading the effort against climate change, as the state considers a radical plan to deregister vehicles that run on diesel or petrol by 2030. He plans for the city of Mumbai to become a climate-resilient metropolis which is carbon-neutral by 2050, which is 20 years before India's target for carbon neutrality.

Following a rebellion within his party and resulting political crisis on 29 June 2022, Thackeray resigned from the post of Chief Minister of Maharashtra ahead of a floor test ordered by BJP appointed governor Bhagat Singh Koshyari. Thackeray challenged the order in the Supreme Court of India citing the pending disqualification motion of the rebel MLAs, but the Supreme Court refused to stay the floor test.

Loss of Control over Shiv Sena Party 
Uddhav Thackeray took over as the leader of Shiv Sena in 2012 after his father, Bal Thackeray, passed away. However, in recent years, his leadership of the party has been challenged. After Eknath Shinde established the government in Maharashtra, he began using the Shiv Sena name and symbols without Uddhav Thackeray, leading to a leadership dispute within the party. Despite challenging this in court and before the Election Commission of India, Uddhav Thackeray's faction was ultimately unsuccessful in its bid to maintain control over the party, as the commission recognized Eknath Shinde's faction as the legitimate Shiv Sena party.

Change in Bylaws 
The Election Commission of India mandates that every political party follows a democratic process. In 2018, Uddhav Thackeray oversaw changes to the Shiv Sena party constitution that were criticized for centralizing control of the party and not allowing for free, fair, and transparent elections for party positions. The Election Commission of India deemed these amendments undemocratic, further eroding Uddhav Thackeray's control over the party.

Eknath Shinde's Challenge and Takeover 
More recently, Uddhav Thackeray faced a significant challenge to his leadership when Eknath Shinde, a key member of the party, called for breaking the Maha Vikas Aghadi alliance and re-establishing an alliance with the Bharatiya Janata Party. Despite gathering support from two-thirds of his party members, Uddhav Thackeray ignored their requests, leading to a political crisis that resulted in his resignation as Chief Minister of Maharashtra. Through a legal battle, Eknath Shinde claimed that he had the support of the majority of Shiv Sena members, and the Election Commission of India recognized his faction as the legitimate Shiv Sena party, effectively granting him control over the party.

Personal life
Thackeray has always had a keen interest in photography and has exhibited his collection of aerial shots of various forts of Maharashtra at the Jehangir Art Gallery in 2004. He has also taken photographs of wildlife including those of the Kanha, Gir, Ranthambore, Bharatpur national parks. Due to these experiences he named his first photography exhibition in 1999 as "Live and Let Live. He has also published photo-books Maharashtra Desh (2010) and Pahava Vitthal (2011), capturing various aspects of Maharashtra and the warkaris during Pandharpur Wari respectively in the two books. 

On 16 July 2012, Thackeray was admitted to Lilavati Hospital after he reported chest pain. He underwent an angioplasty and all the three blockages in his arteries were successfully removed. On 12 November 2021, he underwent a cervical spine surgery at the HN Reliance Hospital.

Family
Thackeray is married to Rashmi Thackeray and has two sons, Aaditya and Tejas.

Rashmi Thackeray (née Patankar) is the editor of Saamana and Marmik. She is the daughter of Madhav Patankar who runs his family business and comes from a middle-class family and also a RSS member. She lived in suburban Dombivli and did her Bachelor of Commerce degree from V G Vaze College in Mulund. She joined the Life Insurance Corporation of India as a contract employee in 1987. She became the friend of Raj Thackeray 's sister Jaywanti and through her came into contact with Uddhav Thackeray. Later they got married in 1989.

The elder son Aaditya is the president of the Yuva Sena. He was serving as Cabinet Minister of Tourism and Environment Government of Maharashtra.

The younger son Tejas is an Indian conservationist and wildlife researcher.

See also
 Uddhav Thackeray ministry  
Political families of India
Political families of Maharashtra

Notes

References

External links
 
 Maharashtra Chief Minister's profile

1960 births
Living people
Chief Ministers of Maharashtra
Marathi politicians
Maharashtra politicians
Shiv Sena politicians
Indian Hindus
Anti-Bihari sentiment
Politicians from Mumbai
Bal Thackeray
Far-right politicians in India
Thackeray family